Gustaf Adolf Tenggren (November 3, 1896 – April 9, 1970) was a Swedish-American illustrator. He is known for his Arthur Rackham-influenced fairy-tale style and use of silhouetted figures with caricatured faces. Tenggren was a chief illustrator for The Walt Disney Company in the late 1930s, in what has been called the Golden Age of American animation, when animated feature films such as Snow White and the Seven Dwarfs, Fantasia, Bambi and Pinocchio were produced.

Early career
Gustaf Tenggren was born in 1896 in Magra parish (now part of Alingsås Municipality), in Västra Götaland County, Sweden. In 1913 he received a scholarship to study painting at Valand, the art school in Gothenburg, Sweden. Tenggren's early schooling and artistic influences were solidly grounded in Scandinavian techniques, motifs and myths; he worked with illustrating in the popular Swedish folklore and fairy tales annual Bland Tomtar och Troll ("Among Gnomes and Trolls"), where he succeeded illustrator John Bauer.

After his first exhibition in 1920, Tenggren immigrated to the U.S. where he joined his sister in Cleveland, Ohio. Moving to New York City in 1922, he made a name for himself in magazine illustration and advertising, while continuing to illustrate children's books.

Disney Company
In the 1920s, while continuing to illustrate a large number of children's books, Tenggren worked consistently in advertising up until the Great Depression; in 1936, he was hired by Walt Disney Productions, to work as a chief illustrator with Snow White and the Seven Dwarfs. Tenggren was not only a concept artist on this movie, but he did much of the illustrations for the non-animated tie-ins to the film, most notably the serialized version of Snow White which was featured in two successive issues of Good Housekeeping just prior to the film's release.
He later worked with productions such as Bambi and Pinocchio, as well as backgrounds and atmospheres of films such as The Ugly Duckling and The Old Mill.

Children's books

Although his work for the studio was still that way, Tenggren never painted in the Rackham fairy-tale illustration style again after he left the Disney. From 1942 to 1962, Tenggren worked for Little Golden Books with illustrations for children's books such as Saggy Baggy Elephant, Tawny Scrawny Lion, The Shy Little Kitten, Little Black Sambo, and The Poky Little Puppy, which became the single all-time best-selling hardcover children's book in English; and "King Arthur and the Knights of the Round Table," Emma Gelders Sterne's retelling of the Arthurian Legend. During these years his production increased, as did the marketability of his name with a stream of Tenggren books.

After he moved to the United States in 1920, he never returned to Sweden again. Gustaf Tenggren died in 1970 at Dogfish Head in Southport, Maine.

Legacy
Although the name Gustaf Tenggren remains relatively unknown, his work is widely recognized, both that in the Disney films and his work in the Little Golden Books. After his death, much of his non-Disney art was donated to the University of Minnesota to be included in the Kerlan Collection, a special library focusing on children's literature.

In memory of Gustaf Tenggren, a  bronze sculpture of Pinocchio, designed by the American pop artist Jim Dine, has been erected in downtown Borås, a city south of Tenggren's birthplace. At the cost of SEK 9.5 million, the Pinocchio sculpture was supposed to be paid for by private donations. The statue was erected on a tiered pedestal at the beginning of Allégatan, a main street in the center of Borås at the start of the Borås Festival of the Arts on May16, 2008.

Filmography

Illustrations
Snow White and the Seven Dwarfs (1937)
Pinocchio (1940)
Fantasia (Night on Bald Mountain/Ave Maria segment)(1940)
Bambi (1942)

Background illustrations
Little Hiawatha (1937)
The Old Mill (1937)
The Ugly Duckling (1939)

Illustrated works
1927
Small Fry and the Winged Horse, Ruth Campbell
1928
Dickey Byrd, Elizabeth Woodruff

1932
The Ring of the Nibelung, Gertrude Henderson

1938
Stories from a Magic World, Elizabeth Woodruff

1942
 Runaway Home, Elizabeth Coatsworth
 Bedtime Stories, Gustaf Tenggren
 The Poky Little Puppy, Janette Sebring Lowrey 
 The Tenggren Tell-it-Again Book, Katharine Gibson

1943 
 The Lively Little Rabbit, George Duplaix
 The Story of England, Beatrice Curtis Brown
 Stories from the Great Metropolitan Opera, Helen Dike
 Sing for Christmas, Opal Wheeler
 
1944 
 Little Match Girl, Hans Christian Andersen
 Sing For America, Opal Wheeler 
 Tenggren's Story Book, Gustaf Tenggren
 
1946 
 Farm Stories, Kathryn and Byron Jackson 
 The Shy Little Kitten, Cathleen Schurr
 
1947 
 The Big Brown Bear, George Duplaix
 The Saggy Baggy Elephant, Kathryn and Byron Jackson

1948
 Little Black Sambo, Helen Bannerman
 Cowboys and Indians, Kathryn and Byron Jackson
 
1950
 The Little Trapper, Kathryn & Byron Jackson
 Pirates, Ships and Sailors, Kathryn and Byron Jackson
 
1951
 The Night Before Christmas, Clement C. Moore

1952 
 The Tawny Scrawny Lion, Kathryn and Byron Jackson 

1953 
 Thumbelina, Hans Christian Andersen
 Topsy Turvy Circus, George Duplaix
 Jack and the Beanstalk, English Folk Tale
 
1954
 The Golden Goose, Jacob and Wilhelm Grimm
 
1955 
 The Giant with the Three Golden Hairs, Jacob and Wilhelm Grimm
 Snow White and Rose Red, Jacob and Wilhelm Grimm 

1957 
 Golden Tales from Arabian Nights, Margaret Seifer and Irving Shapiro 

1959 
 The Lion´s Paw: A Tale of African Animals, Jane Werner Watson 

1961 
 The Canterbury Tales, A. Kent Hieatt and Constance Hieatt

References

Conrad, JoAnn. Fantasy Imaginaries and Landscapes of Desire: Gustaf Tenggren’s Forgotten Decades
John Canemaker, Before the animation begins : the art and lives of Disney inspirational sketch artists, New York : Hyperion, 1996 
Steve Santi, Illustrators/Authors-Collecting Little Golden Books, Florence, Alabama : Books Americana, 1989 
From Swedish fairy tales to American fantasy : Gustaf Tenggren's illustrations 1920-1970, Minneapolis : University Art Museum, University of Minnesota, 1986
Pinocchio delar Borås befolkning, by Lars Råde, in the Expressen, March 24, 2006
Kultur Väst: Jim Dines Pinoccio har landat

Notes

External links
Gustaf Tenggren's World
International Animated Film Society : Gustaf Tenggren's Small Fry and the Winged Horse
Gustaf Tenggren - Västgöten som ritade sagofigurer åt Walt Disney
BPIB : Gustaf Tenggren 
ASIFA-Hollywood Animation Archive Biopedia
Tenggren's Grimm's Fairy Tales
Gustaf Adolf Tenggren artwork can be viewed at American Art Archives web site
Pinocchio — or Walking to Borås

1896 births
1970 deaths
People from Alingsås Municipality
Swedish emigrants to the United States
American illustrators
Animators from Maine
Swedish illustrators
Little Golden Books
Swedish animators
People from Southport, Maine
Walt Disney Animation Studios people
Fleischer Studios people
Valand School of Fine Arts alumni